Ban Geum-ryeon (also known as The Story of Pan Jinlian) is a 1982 South Korean film directed by Kim Ki-young, based upon Jin Ping Mei. Filmed in 1975, the film was banned at the time, and 40 minutes of footage had been censored when it was finally released.

Synopsis
A historical drama set in ancient China.

Cast
 Lee Hwa-si
 Shin Seong-il
 Park Chun-deok
 Park Jung-ja
 Nam Neung-mi
 Jang Mi-ja
 Kim Young-ae
 Park Am
 Gang Bok-sun
 Jo Jae-seong
 Lee Chi-wu
Chu Song-woong

Notes

Bibliography

External links 
 
 

1982 films
1980s Korean-language films
Films directed by Kim Ki-young
South Korean historical films
1980s historical films
Films based on Jin Ping Mei
Censored films
Film controversies in South Korea